Humphrey Gilbert-Carter (1884–1969) was a British botanist and the first scientific director of the Cambridge Botanic Garden (1921–1950), being succeeded by John Gilmour. The second son of the colonial governor Sir Thomas Gilbert-Carter and Susan Laura Hocker he was educated at Tonbridge School and Edinburgh University. After further studies at Marburg University and Cambridge University, he served as a botanist on the Botanical Survey of India during the First World War.

In 1921 Gilbert-Carter returned to Cambridge to take up his position as Director of the University Botanic Garden and Curator of the Herbarium at the Botany School where he taught at the age of 37. Within a year he had published his first book, Guide To The  Botanic Garden Cambridge (1922), followed by his Descriptive Labels for Botanic Gardens (1924). The gardens were much depleted, because of the war but his friendship with Reginald Cory, a fellow alumnus, resulted in considerable funding including the building of Cory Lodge as a residence for the Director.

Amongst his students, Donald Piggott, would later become a professor in the Botany School, and director of the garden (1984–1995). Gilbert-Carter is remembered by the Gilbert Carter Woodland in the Garden.

References

Bibliography 

 
 
 
 
 

British botanists
People educated at Tonbridge School
Alumni of the University of Edinburgh
University of Marburg alumni
Alumni of the University of Cambridge
Academics of the University of Cambridge
1884 births
1969 deaths